Goddard High School is a public high school located in Goddard, Kansas, United States.  It is operated by Goddard USD 265 school district and serves students in grades 9 to 12.  It is one of two high schools located within the city limits of Goddard. The school colors are blue and white. The enrollment for the 2009–2010 school year is approximately 1,600 students, before the Goddard/Eisenhower split. After the split in 2011, the enrollment has been around 800. Goddard High School was selected as a Blue Ribbon School in 2012.

Goddard High is a member of the Kansas State High School Activities Association and offers a variety of sports programs. Athletic teams compete in the 'Ark Valley Chisholm Trail League' in the 5A division and are known as the "Lions". Extracurricular activities are also offered in the form of performing arts, school publications, and clubs.

Academics

In 2012, Goddard High School was selected as a Blue Ribbon School. The Blue Ribbon Award recognizes public and private schools which perform at high levels or have made significant academic improvements.

Extracurricular activities
The Lions compete in the Ark Valley Chisholm Trail League and are classified as a 5A school. Throughout its history, Goddard has won several state championships in various sports. Many graduates have gone on to participate in Division I, Division II, and Division III athletics.

Athletics
The baseball team is often referred to as a pipeline to MLB. Its baseball team has 3 players currently in the minor leagues. The wrestling team has been nationally ranked, winning the state championship in 1999, 2006, 2008, 2009, 2010, 2015, 2016, 2017, 2018, 2019, and 2020. The Lions also finished runner-up in 2007 and 2014.

State championships

Music
The Goddard High School's band program has traveled nationwide and has accumulated numerous awards for its marching band, symphonic winds, symphonic band, full and string orchestra, and two jazz bands.

Notable alumni
 Travis Banwart, professional baseball player
 Jeff Berblinger, professional baseball player
 Tyler Caldwell, Wrestling World Champion and 4 time NCAA all American  
 Derek Norris, professional baseball player
 Logan Watkins, professional baseball player

See also
 List of high schools in Kansas
 List of unified school districts in Kansas
Other high schools in Goddard USD 265 school district
 Eisenhower High School in Goddard

References

External links
 Official school website
 USD 265, school district
 USD 265 School District Boundary Map, KDOT
 Goddard City Map, KDOT

Public high schools in Kansas
Schools in Sedgwick County, Kansas